Warwick Academy is the oldest school in Bermuda, established in about 1659. It is located in Warwick Parish.

It was named after the English colonial administrator Robert Rich, 2nd Earl of Warwick, who gave the original land. Its first Schoolmaster was Richard Norwood, the mathematician who had carried out the first and second surveys of Bermuda in 1616 and 1627, respectively.

The school
Warwick Academy was formerly a government-aided (a privately owned school, with its own board of governors, operating as part of the public school system in exchange for government funding) secondary school but since 1992 it has been a selective independent mixed-sex day school for students aged 4 to 19. According to the school's Student Handbook, it has a reputation for high academic standards and positive discipline. It is divided into a Primary school and a Secondary school. The school's motto is "Quo Non Ascendam". The current principal is Mr. David Horan. Head of Secondary is Ms. Anne Coakley.

Academics
In addition to the usual GCSE and IGCSE courses, based on the UK national curriculum, the school also offers the IB Diploma and BTEC in years 12 and 13.

Every student is required to take part in at least two extra-curricular activities. Community service is compulsory in years 7 to 9.

References

External links
 Warwick Academy
 

Schools in Bermuda
Secondary schools in Bermuda
Warwick Parish
International Baccalaureate schools